Oromahoe is a locality in Northland, New Zealand. It lies on state highway 10.

Oromāhoe Marae and Ngāti Kawa meeting house are a meeting ground for the local Ngāpuhi hapū of Ngāti Kawa and Ngāti Rāhiri.

Education
Oromahoe School is a coeducational full primary (years 1–8) school with a decile rating of 6 and a roll of 58 in 2009. It was established as a mission school in the 1870s, and later became a Native School. More than 80% of students live outside the school bus area and are transported to and from school by private vehicles.

Notes

External links
 Oromahoe School website

Far North District
Populated places in the Northland Region